The University of Montana is home to a variety of institutes ranging from Health to Business to Public Policy. UM is home to a variety of institutes and research centers with many regarding ecology, environmentalism, wildlife preservation, Native American Issues, and health.

Projects, centers, and institutes

Biological sciences
Avian Science Center
Herbarium
Montana Biotechnology Center
Montana Ecology of Infectious Diseases
Murdock DNA Sequencing Facility

Business and trade
Bureau of Business & Economic Research
Montana World Trade Center

Education
Center for Teaching Excellence
Institute for Educational Research and Service
Montana Geriatric Education Center
Montana Partners In Ecology
Multicultural Learning Solutions
Schwanke Honors Institute

Environment and nature
Center for Riverine Science and Stream Re-naturalization
Greening UM
Institute for Tourism & Recreation Research
Lubrecht Experimental Forest
Montana Climate Center
Montana Cooperative Wildlife Research Unit (MT CWRU)
Montana Environmental Consortium
Montana Natural History Center
Mount Sentinel Vegetation Management & Restoration
Northern Rocky Mountain Science Center - Missoula Field Station
Paleontology Center
Wilderness Information Network
Wilderness Institute
Yellow Bay–Flathead Lake Biological Station

Health
Biomedical Research Infrastructure Network (BRIN)
Center for Environmental Health Sciences
Institute for Gerontology Education
International Heart Institute
Montana Cancer Institute Foundation
Montana Center for Childhood Trauma
Montana Center for Work Physiology and Exercise Metabolism
Montana Neuroscience Institute Foundation
National Rural Bioethics Project
Center for Structural and Functional Neuroscience
Physical Therapy Clinic
Rural Institute on Disabilities

Humanities
Center for Ethics
Environmental Writing Institute
Montana Committee for the Humanities

Native American issues
Indian Law Clinic
Native American Center of Excellence–Skaggs School of Pharmacy

Public policy and service
Maureen and Mike Mansfield Center
Maureen and Mike Mansfield Foundation
Montana Public Policy Research Institute
Montana Technology Corps

Regional issues
O'Connor Center for the Rocky Mountain West

Science, general
National Science Foundation–EPSCOR
Partnership for Comprehensive Equity (PACE)

Other
Center for Work-Based Learning
English Language Programs

Notes

Research at the University of Montana
Research institutes in Montana
University of Montana